Anwal is a village in Rohtak district of Haryana, India. According to 2011 Census of India population of the village is 4,877.

References

Villages in Rohtak district